The Norwegian Dance Critics Award (Den norske Dansekritikerprisen or Kritikerprisen) is awarded by the Norwegian Critics' Association (Norsk Kritikerlag) and has been awarded every year since 1977. For other Norwegian Critics Awards, see the Norwegian Literature Critics Award, which has been awarded every year since 1950, the Norwegian Theatre Critics Award, which has been awarded every year since 1939 (except 1940-45), and the Norwegian Music Critics Award, which has been awarded every year since 1947.

Annual Norwegian Dance Critics Award Winners
 1976/77 – Marte Sæther
 1977/78 – Ellen Kjellberg
 1978/79 – Sissel Westnes
 1979/80 – Fredrik Rütter
 1980/81 – Indra Lorentzen
 1981/82 – Ketil Gudim
 1982/83 – Toni Herlofson
 1983/84 – Sølvi Edvardsen
 1984/85 – Kjersti Alveberg
 1985/86 – Gro Rakeng
 1986/87 – Cathrine Smith
 1987/88 – Brian Toney
 1988/89 – Lise Eger
 1989/90 – Judith Rowan Kongsgaard
 1990/91 – not awarded
 1991/92 – Jane Hveding
 1992/93 – Marius Kjos and Karsten Solli
 1993/94 – Nuri Ribera
 1994/95 – Ingun Bjørnsgaard
 1995/96 – Arlene Wilkes
 1996/97 – Line Alsaker
 1997/98 – Jo Strømgren
 1998/99 – Oslo Danse Ensemble by Merete Lingjærde
 1999/00 – Richard Suttie
 2000/01 – Ingrid Lorentzen
 2001/02 – Christine Thomassen
 2002/03 – Henriette Slorer
 2003/04 – Therese Skauge
 2004/05 – Maiko Nishino for Odile/Odette
 2005/06 – Camilla Spidsøe
 2006/07 – not awarded
 2007/08 – Ina Christel Johannessen
 2008/09 – Odd Johan Fritzøe
 2009/10 – Ingun Bjørnsgaard
 2010/11 – Kristian Ruutu

References

See also
 About Dance Information Norway And Dance in Norway on Dance Information Norway

Norwegian awards
Dance awards
1977 establishments in Norway
Awards established in 1977

de:Kritikerprisen (Norwegen)
no:Kritikerprisen
nn:Den norske Kritikerprisen
ru:Премия Ассоциации норвежских критиков
sv:Kritikerpriset (Norge)